On Stage at World Cafe Live is a DVD by American band Living Colour.

On Stage at World Cafe Live may also refer to:

 On Stage at World Cafe Live, a DVD by Duncan Sheik
 On Stage at World Cafe Live, a DVD by Jennifer Glass and Danielia Cotton
 On Stage at World Cafe Live, a DVD by Joshua Redman
 On Stage at World Cafe Live, a DVD by Marshall Crenshaw
 On Stage at World Cafe Live, a DVD by Naked Eyes
 On Stage at World Cafe Live, a DVD by Rhett Miller
 On Stage at World Cafe Live, a DVD by Rita Coolidge
 On Stage at World Cafe Live, a DVD by Shemekia Copeland
 On Stage at World Cafe Live, a DVD by Steve Forbert
 On Stage at World Cafe Live, a DVD by The Knack